Veronica Rehn-Kivi (born 10 February 1956) is a Finnish politician, representing the Swedish People's Party. She was born in Helsinki, and became a member of the Parliament of Finland in August 2016, after Carl Haglund left his seat. Rehn-Kivi has been a member of the City Council of Kauniainen since 1997 and chairman of the City Council since 2015.

Rehn-Kivi is daughter of former Minister of Defence Elisabeth Rehn and her husband, Ove Rehn. She is married with Timo Kivi and has three children.

References

1956 births
Living people
Politicians from Helsinki
Swedish-speaking Finns
Swedish People's Party of Finland politicians
Members of the Parliament of Finland (2015–19) 
Members of the Parliament of Finland (2019–23)
21st-century Finnish women politicians